General Norton may refer to:

Chapple Norton (1746–1818), British Army lieutenant general
Edward F. Norton (1884–1954), British Army lieutenant general
George Norton (fl. 1984–2020), British Army major general
John Norton (soldier) (1918–2004), U.S. Army lieutenant general

See also
Attorney General Norton (disambiguation)